The ICE Most Wanted is a most wanted list maintained by the United States Immigration and Customs Enforcement (ICE). Shortly after the formation of ICE, the list was originally unveiled as the ICE Most Wanted Criminal Aliens on May 14, 2003. The list includes individuals accused of serious transnational crime and being a threat to public safety.

Categories 
The list includes the "most wanted" of four units of the Immigration and Customs Enforcement:

 Homeland Security Investigations – Those wanted for conducting criminal acts that threaten the national security of the United States
 Enforcement and Removal – Those wanted for serious criminal offenses who are destined to be removed from the United States
 Human Trafficking – Those wanted for being involved in severe acts of human trafficking
 VOICE Office – Those wanted for committing crimes against the public in the United States who had an existing status to be removed

See also 
 FBI Ten Most Wanted Fugitives

External links 
 Official ICE Most Wanted Website

References 

Criminals by status
Law enforcement
Most wanted lists
United States immigration law